Yttrium(III) fluoride  is an inorganic chemical compound with the chemical formula YF3. It is not known naturally in 'pure' form. The fluoride minerals containing essential yttrium include tveitite-(Y) (Y,Na)6Ca6Ca6F42 and gagarinite-(Y) NaCaY(F,Cl)6. Sometimes mineral fluorite contains admixtures of yttrium.

Synthesis
YF3 can be produced by reacting fluorine with yttria or yttrium hydroxide with hydrofluoric acid.
Y(OH)3 + 3HF → YF3 + 3H2O

Occurrence and uses
It occurs as the mineral waimirite-(Y).

Yttrium(III) fluoride can be used for the production of metallic yttrium, thin films, glasses and ceramics.

Hazards
Conditions/substances to avoid are: acids, active metals and moisture.

References

Fluorides
Metal halides
Yttrium compounds